Ripped Up and So Sedated is a various artists compilation album released in 1993 by Re-Constriction Records.

Reception
A critic at Aiding & Abetting reviewed Ripped Up and So Sedated positively, proclaiming "Ampersand" by Eggbound as the standout track and that every band represented on the compilation deserved airplay.

Track listing

Personnel
Adapted from the Ripped Up and So Sedated liner notes.

 Chase – compiling, design
 A.T. Tribby – cover art
 Ed Yaffa – illustrations

Release history

References

External links 
 Ripped Up and So Sedated at Discogs (list of releases)

1993 compilation albums
Electro-industrial compilation albums
Re-Constriction Records compilation albums